Almonte is a surname. Notable people with the surname include:

 Abraham Almonte (born 1989), Major League Baseball player
 Carlos Eduardo Almonte, arrested in 2010 on terrorism-related charges
 Danny Almonte (born 1987), former little league baseball player in the United States
 Edwin Almonte (born 1976), baseball player in the United States
 Erick Almonte (born 1978), minor league baseball player in the United States
 Gloria Almonte (born 1983), American beauty queen from the Bronx, New York
 Héctor Almonte (born 1975), baseball player in the United States
 Jose T. Almonte (born 1934), Filipino general
 Juan Almonte (1803–1869), Mexican official and diplomat
 Yency Almonte (born 1994), American baseball player
 Zoilo Almonte (born 1989), Major League Baseball player